Giorgi Chkoidze (born 17 May 1991) is a Georgian rugby union player. His position is hooker, and he currently plays for The Black Lion in the Rugby Europe Super Cup and for the Georgia national team.

References

Rugby union players from Georgia (country)
Living people
1991 births
Lelo Saracens players
Rugby union players from Tbilisi
Male rugby sevens players
Rugby union hookers
Georgia international rugby union players
Lokomotiv Penza players
The Black Lion players